Cornelius Johnson (born November 29, 2000) is an American football wide receiver for the Michigan Wolverines.

Early years and high school career
Johnson attended the Brunswick School in Greenwich, Connecticut. He caught 129 passes for 2,167 yards and 33 touchdowns at Brunswick. As a senior in 2018, he was selected as the Gatorade Player of the Year in Connecticut.

College career
Johnson's mother is a graduate of the University of Michigan Medical School. In December 2018, Johnson announced his commitment to play college football at Michigan.

As a freshman in 2019, he caught four passes for 61 yards and a touchdown against Michigan State. As a sophomore, he appeared in all six games (three as a starter) in Michigan's COVID-shortened season, catching 16 passes for 254 yards, including 82 yards against Indiana and 105 yards against Rutgers.

In 2021, Johnson led Michigan with 40 receptions for 627 yards and three touchdowns. On September 18, he connected with Cade McNamara for an 87-yard touchdown reception, the third longest catch in Michigan football history. Against Wisconsin on October 2, he had two touchdown receptions.

As a senior in 2022, Johnson caught 29 passes in the regular season for 460 yards and six touchdowns. Against Ohio State, he caught four passes for 160 yards, including receiving touchdowns of 69 and 75 yard, both in the second quarter helping to lead the Wolverines to a victory over the Buckeyes.

Statistics

References

External links

 Michigan Wolverines bio

2000 births
Living people
American football wide receivers
Michigan Wolverines football players
People from Greenwich, Connecticut
Players of American football from Connecticut